Kevin Erondu, better known as K.E. on the Track, is an American record producer.

Early life
Kevin Erondu was born in Tampa, Florida. He originated in Valdosta, Georgia.

Career 
K.E.'s breakthrough came in 2009, when he produced the single "Swag Surfin" by rap group Fast Life Yungstaz. The song received airplay and charted at No. 62 on the Billboard Hot 100.

In 2010, he worked on rapper Roscoe Dash's debut album Ready Set Go!, where he produced 5 of the 9 songs, including both singles. "All the Way Turnt Up" was released in January 2010 and peaked at No. 46 on the Billboard Hot 100. It spawned multiple remixes by artists such as Ludacris, Fabolous and MGK. K.E. also co-wrote and produced the second single "Show Out", released in August the same year.

In 2011, he produced the song "You the Boss" by Rick Ross and Nicki Minaj, which was originally released as the first single from Ross' fifth studio album God Forgives, I Don't. Eventually the track was taken off the final track list, even though it peaked at No. 62 on the Billboard Hot 100. It was also placed at number 33 and number 37, respectively, on the Billboard Year-end charts for Hot Rap Songs and Hot R&B/Hip-Hop Songs.

In 2012, K.E. worked with Future on his debut album Pluto. K.E. produced the song "Magic," which appeared on Future's 2011 mixtape True Story and its remix with rapper T.I., which was featured on the album. "Magic" was released as the second single from Pluto in January 2012 and peaked at No. 69 on the Billboard Hot 100. Later in 2012, K.E. produced the track "I'm So Blessed" (featuring Big Sean, Wiz Khalifa, Ace Hood and T-Pain) from DJ Khaled's sixth studio album Kiss the Ring. After Khaled heard K.E.'s production on "You the Boss," he contacted him to get some beats and created the song, which made the cut for the album.

As a lead artist and record producer, K.E. has released a number of instrumental mixtapes in the Hip hop, trap and EDM genres, such as The Art of Trap, EDM Nation 1 & 2 and the Best Beats in the World series.

In November 2012, K.E. stated he was working on Future's second album, as well as tracks with, Young Jeezy, Eminem, French Montana and Kirko Bangz. In December 2013, the lead single from Rick Ross' Mastermind "The Devil Is A Lie" was released, crediting K.E. as the song's producer. In Jan. 2014 K.E. released singles with artists including Kevin Gates, Shy Glizzy, and Tracy-T. He also produced Mila J's lead single, entitled ' Pain In My Heart. In December 2014, K.E. produced three singles on rapper Shy Glizzy's mixtape "LAW 3"

In January 2015, K.E. created Beat Mechanics Entertainment to sign artists and producers.

He has a Grammy Award nomination for co-producing Tamar Braxton’s Love and War album.

Discography 
2010: Best Beats in the World 
2011: Best Beats in the World 2 
2012: Best Beats in the World 3 
2012: Best Beats in the World 4 
2012: EDM Nation 
2013: EDM Nation 2 
2013: The Art of Trap

Production discography

Singles

Other songs

2009 
Fast Life Yungstaz – Jamboree
02 – Bands
03 – Swag Surfin
04 – Party Time
05 – Mr. Lenox
09 – Prada Walkin

Lil Wayne – No Ceilings
01 – Swag Surf

2010 
J.Reu – The Huggz -N- Kissez Mixtape
08 – I Ain't Even Famous
15 – All the Way Turned Out

Roscoe Dash – Ready Set Go!
01 – Ready Set Go
02 – All the Way Turnt Up
03 – Show Out
08 – I Be Shopping
09 – All I Know

Nicki Minaj – non-album single
01 – Girlfriend

Ace Hood – The Statement
05 – Why You Mad
 Ball Out – non-album single
 Wind It – non-album single

2012 
Maino – The Day After Tomorrow
 9 – Let It Fly
Chris Brown – Future: The Prequel
 3 – Gettin' Money
Chris Brown – non-album single
 Bitch I'm Paid
Future – Astronaut Status
21 – No Matter What

Gucci Mane – Trap Back
17 – Club Hoppin

Cash Out – It's My Time
15 – No Red Light

Future– Pluto
05 – Magic (Remix)

Travis Porter – From Day 1
09 – Party Time

Rick Ross – God Forgives, I Don't
00 – You the Boss

DJ Khaled – Kiss the Ring
06 – I'm So Blessed

Bobby V – Dusk Till Dawn
03 – Mirror

Chief Keef – Finally Rich
06 – Kay Kay
2 Chainz ft. Waka Flocka
 Ball – non-album single

2013 
Young Thug – 1017 Thug
17 – Tabernacle

Future & Freeband Gang – Black Woodstock: The Soundtrack
07 – Blow Them Bands

Robb Bank$ – Tha City
Trust Me

SD – Life of a Savage 3
04 – Gotta Get It

2021 
Tommy MV$ERVTI – Tommy MV$ERVTI vs. K.E. On The Track
01 - I Get That
02 - 5Ever
03 - Meson Rey

References

External links 
 
 How 'Swag Surfin',' a song with Tampa Bay roots, still crushes clubs eight years later

American investors
African-American record producers
American businesspeople in retailing
American hip hop record producers
American stock traders
Businesspeople from Atlanta
Musicians from Atlanta
Living people
Southern hip hop musicians
Year of birth missing (living people)
21st-century African-American people